State Route 113 (SR 113) is a north–south state highway in the U.S. state of California that runs from around  in the Sacramento Valley west of Rio Vista at State Route 12 to State Route 99 south of Yuba City. It serves as one of two important connecting routes between Interstate 80 and Interstate 5, bypassing Sacramento to the east; the other being Interstate 505 to the west. Past the southern terminus are Collinsville and Birds Landing around the Suisun Bay marshes. Cities along the route include Dixon, Davis, and Woodland. It also shares a stretch of Interstate 80 between just outside UC Davis and Dixon. The section running from Dixon to Woodland is a controlled-access freeway; the remainder is a standard road of two to four lanes. The freeway section spanning from the I-80 interchange in Davis to Woodland is called the Vic Fazio Highway, after the former U.S. House representative of the Davis area, who is credited with obtaining the funding for the freeway upgrade of that section.

Route description

State Route 113 begins at the intersection with State Route 12 between Fairfield and Rio Vista. It heads north on a rural two-lane highway towards the city of Dixon. After heading through the center of the city, it expands to four lanes before reaching Interstate 80. From there, SR 113 is co-routed along I-80, heading northeast towards the city of Davis. SR 113 then splits from I-80 onto its own freeway alignment, heading north near UC Davis. It is the four-lane freeway (known as the Vic Fazio Highway) connecting Interstate 80 in Davis to Interstate 5 in Woodland, thus rivaling Interstate 505 farther west. After leaving Davis, SR 113 continues north through rural areas for a short while, entering Woodland approximately  later. Upon reaching I-5, it is co-routed for a short while and splits from I-5 a mile (1.6 km) later. From there, SR 113 leaves Woodland and again heads north on a rural two-lane highway, turning east and north again into the small community of Knights Landing, intersecting with State Route 45. It then heads northeast through the small community of Robbins, then turns east to end at State Route 99 towards Yuba City.

SR 113 is part of the California Freeway and Expressway System, and south of the northern city limits of Woodland is part of the National Highway System, a network of highways that are considered essential to the country's economy, defense, and mobility by the Federal Highway Administration.

History

The four-lane freeway known as the Vic Fazio Highway connecting I-80 in Davis to I-5 in Woodland was completed in 1990.

Major intersections

See also

References

External links

Caltrans: Route 113 road conditions
California Highways: Route 113
California @ AARoads.com - State Route 113

113
State Route 113
State Route 113
State Route 113
113
U.S. Route 99
Davis, California
Woodland, California